Gleiss Lutz Hootz Hirsch, frequently referred to as Gleiss Lutz, is a business law firm headquartered in Stuttgart, Germany. It is one of Germany's largest law firms, with six German offices in Berlin, Düsseldorf, Frankfurt, Hamburg, Munich, and Stuttgart, and one in Brussels. The firm formerly had offices in Prague. As of 2017, Gleiss Lutz has the seventh-largest number of Chambers-ranked lawyers in Germany. Gleiss Lutz is a full-service business law firm and covers, amongst others, legal areas including corporate law, mergers & acquisitions, competition and antitrust law, labour and employment law as well as litigation and arbitration. Additionally, the firm offers industry-specific groups such as automotive, healthcare or energy.

History 
The firm was founded on 1 April 1949 by Alfred Gleiss, a lawyer in Stuttgart, as an office for decartelisation and competition issues in Stuttgart. In 1956, Helmuth Lutz joined the firm, shortly after the arrival of Christian Hootz and Martin Hirsch. Since 1962, the firm has borne the official name Gleiss Lutz Hootz Hirsch (short: Gleiss Lutz), which is still valid today.

International 
Since 2002, Gleiss Lutz formed a close alliance with British law firm Herbert Smith and Dutch-Belgian firm Stibbe. Herbert Smith put an end to the alliance in 2011, after Gleiss Lutz and Stibbe refused to enter into merger talks. As an independent firm, Gleiss Lutz works with a non-exclusive network of international independent firms worldwide. Gleiss Lutz works closely with three other independent European law firms (Chiomenti in Italy, Cuatrecasas Gonçalves Pereira in Spain and Portugal and Gide Loyrette Nouel in France) within a European Network. In 2015, the four firms combined their banking regulatory expertise with the launch of a joint regulatory hub, based in the Gleiss Lutz offices in Frankfurt/Main, in order to deal with the increasing role of the European Central Bank and the developments following the launch of the Single Supervisory Mechanism (SSM). Furthermore, Gleiss Lutz internationally works with firms such as Stibbe (Benelux), Slaughter and May (UK) or Cravath, Swaine & Moore (USA).

See also
Arved Deringer

References

1949 establishments in Germany
Law firms of Germany